Oi kyries tis avlis (/ English: Ladies of the Courtyard) is a 1966 Greek film based on the theatrical play To ekto patoma (Το έκτο πάτωμα = The Next Step). 
It was made into a movie following the success of the play with Dinos Iliopoulos in 1964 and 1965 at the Gloria Theatre.

The movie was filmed in 1966 by Finos Films and sold 338,081 tickets. The film was directed by Dinos Dimopoulos, a student of Iliopoulos at the Dramatic school. Dinos Iliopoulis was rewarded 90,000 drachmas for his role, a high fee at the time.

Cast
Dinos Iliopoulos ..... Pipis Kathistos
Alekos Alexandrakis ..... Nikos Alexiou
Nora Valsami ..... Anna Bosikou
Dionysis Papagiannopoulos ..... Nondas Bosikos
Eleni Prokopiou ..... Nitsa
Katerina Yioulaki ..... Paraskevi
Kostas Prekas ..... Tasos
Floreta Zana ..... Melita Komninou
Mary Lalopoulou ..... Eleni Kathistou
Dimitris Bislanis ..... club owner

See also
List of Greek films

External links
 

1967 films
1967 comedy films
1960s Greek-language films
Films directed by Dinos Dimopoulos
Finos Film films
Greek comedy films